Herluf Christensen (16 September 1924 – June 1970) was a Danish middle-distance runner. He competed in the men's 800 metres at the 1948 Summer Olympics.

References

1924 births
1970 deaths
Athletes (track and field) at the 1948 Summer Olympics
Danish male middle-distance runners
Olympic athletes of Denmark
Place of birth missing
20th-century Danish people